State Route 198 (SR 198) is an east–west state highway in the U.S. state of California that runs from U.S. Route 101 (US 101) south of King City to Sequoia National Park. It connects the California Central Coast to the mid–Central Valley through Hanford and Visalia, although the most developed portion is in the Central Valley itself. SR 198 intersects the major north–south routes in the Central Valley, including Interstate 5 (I-5), SR 33, and SR 99.

The highway that would become SR 198 was approved for construction in the 1910s through three bond issues, and was added to the state highway system in 1934. Parts of the highway were upgraded to freeway during the 1960s. Another portion was converted to an expressway in between Hanford and Visalia, and was completed in late 2012.

Route description

The road begins at a remote interchange with US 101 south of King City in the Salinas River Valley. Leaving US 101, SR 198 passes through the Priest Valley, climbs the Diablo Range as a two-lane road and crosses over an unnamed pass. It then descends along Warthan Canyon to the town of Coalinga in the agricultural Central Valley, where it briefly runs concurrently with SR 33. On both sides of Coalinga the road passes through the enormous Coalinga Oil Field.

SR 198 then intersects Interstate 5 (I-5) in Fresno County near the Harris Ranch Airport before becoming a freeway west of Lemoore. The landscape becomes a bit less rural as it goes through Hanford and passes near the Hanford Municipal Airport, where it continues as a four-lane expressway from the intersection with SR 43 until SR 198 encounters a freeway-to-freeway interchange with SR 99 as it enters Visalia, the largest city it passes through, and goes by the Visalia Municipal Airport. It remains a freeway until east of Visalia, intersecting SR 65 and passing by College of the Sequoias. SR 198 starts to climb the forested Sierra Nevada and ends at the Sequoia National Park boundary, near Lake Kaweah, where the road continues through the park as the Generals Highway. This is one of the main routes providing access to Sequoia National Park, the other being SR 180 to the north.

SR 198 is part of the California Freeway and Expressway System, and east of I-5 is part of the National Highway System, a network of highways that are considered essential to the country's economy, defense, and mobility by the Federal Highway Administration. SR 198 is eligible to be included in the State Scenic Highway System, but it is not officially designated as a scenic highway by the California Department of Transportation.

History

All of SR 198 was added to the state highway system in the three bond issues floated to pay for the construction of the system. The first bond issue, approved by the state's voters in 1910, included the road from Visalia west to Hanford, connecting the two county seats with the central north–south highway (Route 4, now SR 99). As part of the 1916 bond issue, the route was extended west from Hanford through Coalinga to the coast trunk highway (Route 2, now US 101) near San Lucas, and assigned it the Route 10 designation. The third bond issue, passed in 1919, included a further extension east from Visalia to Sequoia National Park. The entire length of Route 10 was marked as Sign Route 198 in 1934, and this number was adopted legislatively in the 1964 renumbering. The portion east of Interstate 5 near Coalinga was added to the California Freeway and Expressway System in 1959, and parts of it have been built as such. The construction of the freeway east of Visalia to Road 192 was approved in January 1961, with the remainder of the freeway unplanned at that time as contingent on the routing of SR 65. The projected cost in 1958 of the entire freeway east of Visalia was $13 million (equivalent to $ in ) and was scheduled to be completed by 1964. The freeway through Visalia was completed by 1965, with an expressway connecting it to US 99. Also completed was the expressway heading west out of Hanford, with part of it access-controlled west of Lemoore.

Construction began in November 2009 on a project to widen a two-lane,  section of SR 198 between SR 43 and SR 99 into a four-lane expressway. The $60 million project was completed in December 2012.

Future
The Kings County Association of Governments has plans to improve the state highways within the county. Developers are interested in building distribution warehouses in Kings County because of its strategic location midway between the Los Angeles and San Francisco Bay areas, but they are currently turned off by the lack of freeway access. For SR 198, the plan is to extend the freeway segment from Naval Air Station Lemoore to I-5. However, Kings County voters have shown little interest in passing any transportation taxes to fund these projects.

Major intersections

See also

References

External links

 California @ AARoads.com - State Route 198
 Caltrans: Route 198 highway conditions
 California Highways: SR 198

198
State Route 198
State Route 198
State Route 198
State Route 198
198
Streets in Visalia, California
Transportation in Visalia, California
U.S. Route 99